Ashorocetus is a monotypic genus of an extinct primitive baleen whale of the family Aetiocetidae. Fossils of this whale are found from the Chattian Morawan formation, near Ashoro, of upper Oligocene Hokkaido, Japan (paleocoordinates ). Ashorocetus eguchii was described based on a partial skull and is named after the type locality and Kenichiro Eguchi of the Ashoro Museum of Paleontology.

Description
 described four new aetiocetid species, of whom Ashorocetus eguchii was the most primitive.  It has a neatly telescoped skull and is closely related to Chonecetus, another primitive aetiocetid.  Barnes et al. also described Morawanocetus yabukii, a more derived species with a foreshortened braincase, intermediate between Chonecetus and Aetiocetus; Aetiocetus tomitai, the most primitive Aetiocetus discovered; and Aetiocetus polydentatus, the most derived Aetiocetus with a highly telescoped cranium and both homodont and polydont dentition.  Barnes et al. also proposed three subfamilies for Aetiocetidae (Chonecetinae, Morawanocetinae, and Aetiocetinae) to reflect this proposed evolution within the family.
The placement of A. polydentatus in Aetiocetus has, however, been questioned, as has the monophyly (and therefore the proposed subfamilies) of Aetiocetidae.

Sister taxa
Aetiocetus
Chonecetus
Morawanocetus
Willungacetus

References

Notes

Sources
 

 

 

Extinct animals of Japan
Oligocene mammals of Asia
Aetiocetidae
Prehistoric monotypic mammal genera
Prehistoric cetacean genera
Fossil taxa described in 1995